Christer Malmberg is a Swedish former footballer who played as a midfielder. He played most of his games for Malmö FF.

References

Association football midfielders
Swedish footballers
Allsvenskan players
Malmö FF players
Living people
Year of birth missing (living people)